Kirkby is a Scottish and northern English name of Scandinavian origin, meaning "church town". It may refer to:

Places in the United Kingdom 

 Kirkby, Merseyside
 Kirkby, North Yorkshire
 Kirkby-in-Ashfield, Nottinghamshire
 Outwood Academy Kirkby
 Kirkby-in-Furness, Cumbria
 Kirkby la Thorpe, Lincolnshire
 Kirkby on Bain, Lincolnshire
 Kirkby Fleetham, North Yorkshire
 Kirkby Ireleth, Cumbria
 Kirkby Lonsdale, Cumbria
 Kirkby Malham, North Yorkshire
 Kirkby Mallory, Leicestershire
 Kirkby Malzeard, North Yorkshire
 Kirkby Moor, Cumbria
 Kirkby Overblow, North Yorkshire
 Kirkby Stephen, Cumbria
 Kirkby Thore, Cumbria
 East Kirkby, Lincolnshire
 South Kirkby & Moorthorpe, West Yorkshire
 Kirkbymoorside, North Yorkshire

People 

 Bruce Kirkby (born 1968), Canadian adventurer
 Elisabeth Kirkby (born 1921), Australian actress and politician
 Dame Emma Kirkby (born 1949), British soprano singer
 Geoffrey John Kirkby (1918-1998), British Royal Navy officer
 Gordon Kirkby (born 1958), Canadian lawyer and politician
 John Kirkby (died 1290), English ecclesiastic and statesman
 Ollie Kirkby (1886–1964), American actress
 Richard Kirkby (c1625-1681), English politician
 Richard Kirkby (Royal Navy), English captain
 Roger Kirkby (died 1709) (c. 1649–1709), English soldier and politician
 Roger Kirkby (Royalist) (died 1643), English politician
 Sydney L. Kirkby (born 1933), Australian surveyor and Antarctic explorer
 Tim Kirkby (born 1970), British film and television director

Other 
 Chestermere (Kirkby Field) Airport, Alberta, Canada
 Kirkbi AG v. Ritvik Holdings Inc., a Canadian legal case
 Kirkbie Kendal School, a Business and Enterprise College in Kendal, Cumbria, England

See also 
 Kirby (disambiguation)
 Kirkjubæjarklaustur, a place name in Iceland with a parallel etymology and meaning